Li Lihui (born May 1952) is a Chinese banker who served as president of the Bank of China from 2004 to 2014.

Biography
Li was born in Putian, Fujian, in May 1952. In 1974, he was admitted to Xiamen University, majoring in finance. 

Li joined the Chinese Communist Party (CCP) in February 1975. After university in 1977, he was assigned to the People's Bank of China. Beginning in September 1984, he served in several posts in the Industrial and Commercial Bank of China, including vice president of Fujian Branch, chief representative of the Industrial and Commercial Bank of China in Singapore, and general manager of International Business Department. He was elevated to vice president of the bank in July 1994.

In September 2002, he was appointed vice governor of Hainan, but having held the position for almost two years. In August 2004, he became president of the Bank of China, and served until January 2014.

References

1952 births
Living people
People from Putian
Xiamen University alumni
Peking University alumni
Central Party School of the Chinese Communist Party alumni
Chinese bankers
People's Republic of China politicians from Fujian
Chinese Communist Party politicians from Fujian
Delegates to the 12th National People's Congress